The 1998 Speedway Grand Prix of Sweden was the fifth race of the 1998 Speedway Grand Prix season. It took place on 28 August in the Motorstadium in Linköping, Sweden It was fourth Swedish SGP and was won by World Champion Tony Rickardsson. It was third win of his career.

Starting positions draw 

The Speedway Grand Prix Commission nominated Antonín Kasper, Jr. (Czech Republic), Peter Karlsson (Sweden) and Lars Gunnestad (Norway) as Wild Card.

Heat details

The intermediate classification

See also 
 Speedway Grand Prix
 List of Speedway Grand Prix riders

References

External links 
 FIM-live.com
 SpeedwayWorld.tv

S
Speedway Grand Prix
1998